Billy Williams OBE, BSC (born 3 June 1929, Walthamstow, London) is a British cinematographer.

Williams was responsible for shooting a number of films, including Women in Love (1969), On Golden Pond (1981) and Gandhi (1982), for which he won an Academy Award. Williams joined his father, also named Billy, as an apprentice cameraman, remaining with him for four years. Later he served in the RAF as a photographer. On leaving the RAF he obtained a job with British Transport Films (BTF), filming all forms of transportation.

After this, it was to Iraq (where he later shot the opening scenes to The Exorcist, 1973), filming for the Iraq Petroleum Company. At this time he owned his own Arriflex camera. He spent several years in documentary work, hoping that one day he could break into features.

Before his feature debut, he became a cameraman on commercials, where he made contact with future directors Ken Russell and John Schlesinger (who had directed for BTF as well). In 1965, he shot his first feature as director of photography (San Ferry Ann), having by-passed the focus puller and operator stages.  He made several others before shooting Billion Dollar Brain with Russell in 1967.

Williams can be seen in a cameo in the film The Wind and the Lion (1975), playing a British nobleman living in Tangier who is killed in a shootout with Sean Connery's Berber tribesmen. He also appeared with Cher in 1987's Suspect.

Williams retired on New Year's Day 1996. Since retirement he has travelled, conducting workshops on film. He was appointed Officer of the Order of the British Empire (OBE) in the 2009 Birthday Honours. Williams is featured in the book Conversations with Cinematographers by David A. Ellis, published by Scarecrow Press.

Selected filmography
 1965: San Ferry Ann
 1967: Billion Dollar Brain
 1968: 30 Is a Dangerous Age, Cynthia
 1968: The Magus
 1969: Women in Love
 1970: Tam-Lin
 1971: Sunday Bloody Sunday
 1973: The Glass Menagerie
 1973: The Exorcist (opening scenes only)
 1975: The Wind and the Lion
 1976: Voyage of the Damned
 1977: The Devil's Advocate
 1978: The Silent Partner
 1979: Going in Style
 1981: On Golden Pond
 1982: Gandhi
 1983: The Survivors
 1984: Ordeal by Innocence
 1985: Dreamchild
 1987: Suspect
 1989: The Rainbow
 1990: Stella

References

External links
 
 Billy Williams tells his life story at Web of Stories (video)
 Billy Williams tells the story of British Transport Films (video)

1929 births
Living people
British cinematographers
Officers of the Order of the British Empire
Best Cinematographer Academy Award winners